Bishop Raphy Manjaly is the newly appointed Archbishop of the Roman Catholic Archdiocese of Agra, India by Pope Francis. He was installed as Archbishop of Agra on 7 January 2021.

Early life and education 
He was born on 7 February 1958 in Kerala, India to Mrs. Kathreena & Mr. M.V. Chacko. He received his primary education at St. Francis Xavier School, Vendore, Kerala and completed his high school from Tyagarajar High School, Alagappanagar, Trichur, Kerala. He joined St. Lawrence Minor Seminary, Agra, in 1973 and completed it in year 1975. He joined St. Joseph's Regional Seminary, Allahabad, in 1975 and completed his Philosophy and Theology education in year 1983. He completed his graduation and post graduation from Agra University. He completed his Doctorate in Spirituality from Angelicum University, Rome.

Priesthood 
He was ordained a priest on 11 May 1983 at St Mary's Church, Vendore

Episcopate 
He was appointed bishop of Varanasi on 24 February 2007 and consecrated on 30 April 2007. He was Appointed bishop of Allahabad on 17 October 2013 and installed on 3 December 2013. He was appointed Archbishop of Agra on 12 November 2020 & installed on 7th January 2021.

References

1958 births
Living people
21st-century Roman Catholic archbishops in India
Pontifical University of Saint Thomas Aquinas alumni
Bishops appointed by Pope Francis